Ben 10: Alien Force is an action-adventure video game based on the American animated television series of the same name. The game was released in North America on October 28, 2008 and February 2009 in the United Kingdom.

Plot
Ben, Gwen and Kevin encounter the Forever Knights looking for a piece of alien tech at a pier. They also meet an off-world Tetramand Plumber named Gorvan, who is searching for illegal alien tech, and recruits them to help him. 

The trio retrieves components from various places and defeating the Forever Knights and Pickaxe Aliens that were guarding them. Gorvan grows increasingly suspicious with each component collected, and the trio decide to keep an eye on him. Eventually, they learn from Max that Gorvan is a disgraced Plumber who was thrown out of the organization for hoarding and selling illegal alien tech. This prompts Kevin to hunt down Gorvan without backup, with Ben giving chase.

Kevin rushes into Gorvan's hideout, discovering that he has been hoarding alien technology at the behest of some customer. Gorvan releases Xenocytes, who attack Kevin. After catching up with Kevin, Ben finds him partially transformed into a DNAlien. Ben defeats Kevin and turns him back to normal, with the Omnitrix's DNA Repair function, sending him back to Gwen. Ben then finds and defeats Gorvan. He returns to Gwen and Kevin, and they discover that Gorvan was gathering components for a Highbreed, who proceeds to steal a component, and energy source, from them.

They track the Highbreed, who has used the components to build a Highbreed weather tower, which they intend to use to make Earth hospitable to them, in a process which would be fatal for humanity. The team is attacked by a swarm of DNAliens, forcing them to split up. While attempting to shut down the tower, ben accidentally activates it. Gwen and Kevin, however, succeed in disabling the tower's forcefields, allowing Ben to turn into Humongousaur, grow to maximum size and destroy the tower, causing the Highbreed's plan to fail.

Reception

Ben 10: Alien Force received "generally unfavorable" reviews for review aggregator Metacritic.

See also
 Ben 10 (TV series)

References

Alien Force
2008 video games
D3 Publisher games
PlayStation 2 games
Wii games
Nintendo DS games
PlayStation Portable games
Video games developed in the United States
Video games set in the United States
Ben 10
Multiplayer and single-player video games
Superhero video games
Cartoon Network video games
Monkey Bar Games games
1st Playable Productions games
3D platform games